Franck Gilbert Yannick Monnet (born 13 September 1967, in Le Mans) is a French singer-songwriter.
He wrote songs for the following artists: 
Vanessa Paradis (collaboration with Matthieu Chedid for the albums Bliss, 2000, and Divinidylle, 2007),
Tryo (2003),
Murray Head (2006),
Claire Diterzi (2005),
Enrico Macias (2006), 
Emily Loizeau (with whom he produced the album L’Autre Bout du Monde in 2005). ...

in 2000 was awarded the Grand Prix de l’Académie Charles Cros for his album Les Embellies.

He composed the soundtrack for the movie Mer Belle a Agiter (Pascal Chaumeil), produced by France 3 in 2004. In the same year, he was nominated for Prix Constantin for his album Au Grand Jour.

He was also a part of the jury of multiple festivals: 
Chorus des Hauts-de-Seine's Song Contest (2003),
Créteil International Women's Film Festival (2008),
Wellington Song Contest, with Dame Jane Pierard (2011),
Randell Cottage Residency (2022).

He currently lives in New Zealand.

Discography

Playa (1998)
Tout l'hiver
Paco aime Claudine
Bruno
Le petit déjeuner sur l'herbe
Playa
Aubade
Soleil sur le camping des Pinsan
Laurence
Yaya
Le pinceau à chansons
Une statue d'Orphée
Lame sans cible
Le goût de l'océan
Paco aime Mélusine
Les embellies (2000) 
Les bancs
J'adore t'écrire
Soliloque
Gilbert
J'ai perdu la tête
Ma demeure
Tititi car il y a un mais
Les embellies de mai
Lumio
Ever est
Au grand jour (2004)
La routine
Douce, douce vanité
L'orgue hammond
Le livre ouvert
Sa chambre est allumée
Tu parles
L'esclandre
Au grand jour
Mes pompes neuves
T'aimer
Malidor (2006)
La langue des chats
L'insolence des chats
Malidor
Cesare Pavese
Barcelone
London
Fin stupide
18 ans
Trop de lichen
Journal intime
Bonn'aise
Gros cœur
Waimarama (2014)
Anorak
Sans John
Différents
Quelqu'un
Paris
La Belle Industrie
Plus Rien à me Mettre (duo with Camélia Jordana)
Les Faons
Ton Héros
Waimarama

See also

External links
 Tôt ou tard
 EPK from the album Malidor of Frank Monnet (Electronic Press Kit)
 Official YouTube clip of song "Waimarama"
 Official YouTube clip of song "Différents"

French singer-songwriters
French-language singers
1967 births
Living people
French record producers
People from Le Mans